

Events

Pre-1600
138 – Roman emperor Hadrian adopts Antoninus Pius as his son, effectively making him his successor.
 628 – Khosrow II, the last great Shah of the Sasanian Empire (Iran), is overthrown by his son Kavadh II.
1336 – Four thousand defenders of Pilenai commit mass suicide rather than be taken captive by the Teutonic Knights.

1601–1900
1705 – George Frideric Handel's opera Nero premiered in Hamburg.
1836 – Samuel Colt is granted a United States patent for his revolver firearm.
1843 – Lord George Paulet occupies the Kingdom of Hawaii in the name of Great Britain in the Paulet Affair (1843).
1870 – Hiram Rhodes Revels, a Republican from Mississippi, is sworn into the United States Senate, becoming the first African American ever to sit in Congress.
1875 – Guangxu Emperor of Qing dynasty China begins his reign, under Empress Dowager Cixi's regency.

1901–present
1912 – Marie-Adélaïde, the eldest of six daughters of Guillaume IV, becomes the first reigning Grand Duchess of Luxembourg.
1916 – World War I: In the Battle of Verdun, a German unit captures Fort Douaumont, keystone of the French defences, without a fight.
1918 – World War I: German forces capture Tallinn to virtually complete the occupation of Estonia.
1921 – Georgian capital Tbilisi falls to the invading Russian forces after heavy fighting and the Russians declare the Georgian Soviet Socialist Republic.
1932 – Hitler, having been stateless for seven years, obtains German citizenship when he is appointed a Brunswick state official by Dietrich Klagges, a fellow Nazi. As a result, Hitler is able to run for Reichspräsident in the 1932 election.
It is the first purpose-built aircraft carrier to be commissioned by the US Navy.
1939 – As part of British air raid precautions, the first of 2.5 million Anderson shelters is constructed in a garden in Islington, north London.
1941 – The outlawed Communist Party of the Netherlands organises a general strike in German-occupied Amsterdam to protest against Nazi persecution of Dutch Jews.
1947 – The formal abolition of Prussia is proclaimed by the Allied Control Council, the Prussian government having already been abolished by the Preußenschlag of 1932.
  1947   – Soviet NKVD forces in Hungary abduct Béla Kovács—secretary-general of the majority Independent Smallholders' Party—and deport him to the USSR in defiance of Parliament. His arrest is an important turning point in the Communist takeover of Hungary.
1948 – In a coup d'état led by Klement Gottwald, the Communist Party of Czechoslovakia takes control of government in Prague to end the Third Czechoslovak Republic.
1951 – The first Pan American Games are officially opened in Buenos Aires by Argentine President Juan Perón.
1956 – In his speech On the Cult of Personality and Its Consequences, Nikita Khrushchev, leader of the Soviet Union, denounces Stalin.
1980 – The government of Suriname is overthrown by a military coup led by Dési Bouterse.
1986 – People Power Revolution: President of the Philippines Ferdinand Marcos flees the nation after 20 years of rule; Corazon Aquino becomes the Philippines' first female president.
1991 – Disbandment of the Warsaw Pact at a meeting of its members in Budapest.
1999 – Alitalia Flight 1553 crashes at Genoa Cristoforo Colombo Airport in Genoa, Italy, killing four.

Births

Pre-1600
1259 – Infanta Branca of Portugal, daughter of King Afonso III of Portugal and Urraca of Castile (d. 1321)
1337 – Wenceslaus I, Duke of Luxembourg (d. 1383)
1475 – Edward Plantagenet, 17th Earl of Warwick, last male member of the House of York (d. 1499)
1540 – Henry Howard, 1st Earl of Northampton, English aristocrat and courtier (d. 1614)
1543 – Sharaf Khan Bidlisi, Emir of Bitlis (d. 1603)
1591 – Friedrich Spee, German poet and author (d. 1635)

1601–1900
1643 – Ahmed II, Ottoman sultan (d. 1695) 
1663 – Peter Anthony Motteux, French-English author, playwright and translator (d. 1718)
1670 – Maria Margarethe Kirch, German astronomer and mathematician (d. 1720)
1682 – Giovanni Battista Morgagni, Italian anatomist and pathologist (d. 1771)
1707 – Carlo Goldoni, Italian playwright and composer (d. 1793)
1714 – René Nicolas Charles Augustin de Maupeou, French lawyer and politician, Lord Chancellor of France (d. 1792)
1728 – John Wood, the Younger, English architect, designed the Royal Crescent (d. 1782)
1752 – John Graves Simcoe, English-Canadian general and politician, 1st Lieutenant Governor of Upper Canada (d. 1806)
1755 – François René Mallarmé, French lawyer and politician (d. 1835)
1778 – José de San Martín, Argentinian general and politician, 1st President of Peru (d. 1850)
1806 – Emma Catherine Embury, American author and poet (d. 1863)
1809 – John Hart, English-Australian politician, 10th Premier of South Australia (d. 1873)
1812 – Carl Christian Hall, Danish lawyer and politician, 6th Prime Minister of Denmark (d. 1888)
1816 – Giovanni Morelli, Italian historian and critic (d. 1891)
1833 – John St. John, American lawyer and politician, 8th Governor of Kansas (d. 1916)
1841 – Pierre-Auguste Renoir, French painter and sculptor (d. 1919)
1842 – Karl May, German author, poet, and playwright (d. 1912)
1845 – George Reid, Scottish-Australian lawyer and politician, 4th Prime Minister of Australia (d. 1918)
1855 – Cesário Verde, Portuguese poet and author (d. 1886)
1856 – Karl Gotthard Lamprecht, German historian and academic (d. 1915)
  1856   – Mathias Zdarsky, Czech-Austrian skier, painter, and sculptor (d. 1940)
1857 – Robert Bond, Canadian politician; first Prime Minister of Newfoundland (d. 1927)
1860 – William Ashley, English historian and academic (d. 1927)
1865 – Andranik, Armenian general (d. 1927)
1866 – Benedetto Croce, Italian philosopher and politician (d. 1952)
1869 – Phoebus Levene, Russian-American biochemist and physician (d. 1940)
1873 – Enrico Caruso, Italian-American tenor; the most popular operatic tenor of the early 20th century and the first great recording star. (d. 1921)
1877 – Erich von Hornbostel, Austrian musicologist and scholar (d. 1935)
1881 – William Z. Foster, American union leader and politician (d. 1961)
  1881   – Alexei Rykov, Russian politician, Premier of Russia (d. 1938)
1883 – Princess Alice, Countess of Athlone (d. 1981)
1885 – Princess Alice of Battenberg, mother of Prince Philip, Duke of Edinburgh (d. 1969)
1888 – John Foster Dulles, American soldier, lawyer, and politician, 52nd United States Secretary of State (d. 1959)
1890 – Myra Hess, English pianist and educator (d. 1965)
1894 – Meher Baba, Indian spiritual master (d. 1969)
1898 – William Astbury, physicist and molecular biologist (d. 1961)

1901–present
1901 – Vince Gair, Australian politician, 27th Premier of Queensland (d. 1980)
  1901   – Zeppo Marx, American comedian (the youngest of the Marx Brothers) and theatrical agent (d. 1979)
1903 – King Clancy, Canadian ice hockey player, referee, and coach; rated one of the 100 greatest NHL players (d. 1986)
1905 – Perry Miller, American historian, author, and academic (d. 1963)
1906 – Mary Coyle Chase, American journalist and playwright; author of Harvey (d. 1981)
1907 – Sabahattin Ali, Turkish journalist, author, and poet (d. 1948)
1908 – Mary Locke Petermann, cellular biochemist (d. 1975)
  1908   – Frank G. Slaughter, American physician and author (d. 2001)
1910 – Millicent Fenwick, American journalist and politician (d. 1992)
1913 – Jim Backus, American actor and screenwriter; the voice of Mr. Magoo (d. 1989)
  1913   – Gert Fröbe, German actor; title role in Goldfinger (d. 1988)
1915 – S. Rajaratnam, 1st Senior Minister of Singapore (d. 2006)
1917 – Anthony Burgess, English author, playwright, and critic (d. 1993)
1918 – Bobby Riggs, American tennis player; winner of three major titles, 1939–1941 (d. 1995)
1919 – Monte Irvin, American baseball player and executive (d. 2016)
1920 – Philip Habib, American academic and diplomat, Assistant Secretary of State for East Asian and Pacific Affairs (d. 1992)
1921 – Pierre Laporte, Canadian journalist, lawyer, and politician, Deputy Premier of Quebec (d. 1970)
  1921   – Andy Pafko, American baseball player and manager (d. 2013)
1922 – Molly Reilly, Canadian aviator (d. 1980)
1924 – Hugh Huxley, English-American biologist and academic (d. 2013)
1925 – Shehu Shagari, former President of Nigeria (d. 2019)
  1925   – Lisa Kirk, American actress and singer (d. 1990)
1926 – Masatoshi Gündüz Ikeda, Japanese-Turkish mathematician and academic; developed algebraic number theory (d. 2003)
1927 – Ralph Stanley, American bluegrass singer and banjo player; member of International Bluegrass Music Hall of Fame (d. 2016)
1928 – Paul Elvstrøm, Danish yachtsman; winner of four Olympic gold medals, 1948–1960 (d. 2016)
  1928   – A. Leon Higginbotham, Jr., prominent African-American civil rights advocate, author, and federal court judge (d. 1998)
  1928   – Larry Gelbart, American author and screenwriter; creator and producer of M*A*S*H TV series (d. 2009)
 1928 – Richard G. Stern, American author and academic (d. 2013)
  1930   – Wendy Beckett, British nun and art critic for BBC TV with great success in the 1990s (d. 2018)
1932 – Tony Brooks, English racing driver; six Formula One victories, second in 1959 World Championship (d. 2022)
  1932   – Faron Young, American country music singer-songwriter and guitarist; member of Country Music Hall of Fame (d. 1996) 
1934 – Tony Lema, American golfer; winner of the 1964 Open Championship (d. 1966)
  1935   – Oktay Sinanoglu, Turkish physical chemist and molecular biophysicist; two-time nominee for the Nobel Prize in Chemistry (d. 2015) 
1937 – Tom Courtenay, award-winning English actor
  1937   – Bob Schieffer, American political author, journalist and TV interviewer
1938 – Herb Elliott, Australian 1500 metres runner; 1960 Olympic champion and world record holder
  1938   – Farokh Engineer, Indian international cricketer; successful as batsman and wicketkeeper
1940 – Ron Santo, American baseball player and sportscaster (d. 2010)
1941 – David Puttnam, English film producer and academic
1943 – George Harrison, English singer-songwriter, guitarist and film producer; lead guitarist of The Beatles (d. 2001)
1944 – François Cevert, French racing driver (d. 1973)
1946 – Jean Todt, French racing driver and team manager; FIA President, 2009–2021
1947 – Lee Evans, American sprinter and athletics coach; two gold medals and world 400m record at 1968 Olympics (d. 2021)
1949 – Ric Flair, American professional wrestler
  1949   – Amin Maalouf, Lebanese-French journalist and author
1950 – Francisco Fernández Ochoa, Spanish skier; 1972 Olympic slalom champion (d. 2006)
  1950   – Neil Jordan, Irish film director, screenwriter and author
  1950   – Néstor Kirchner, Argentinian politician; 51st President of Argentina, 2003–2007 (d. 2010)
1951 – Don Quarrie, Jamaican sprinter and coach; four Olympic medals and two world records
1952 – Joey Dunlop, Northern Irish motorcycle road racing champion; holds record for most wins (26) at the Isle of Man TT (d. 2000)
1953 – José María Aznar, Spanish politician; Prime Minister of Spain, 1996–2004
1957 – Raymond McCreesh, Irish Republican, hunger striker (d. 1981)
1957 – Tharman Shanmugaratnam, Singapore politician; 5th Senior Minister of Singapore
1958 – Kurt Rambis, American basketball player and coach; four-time NBA Finals champion
1962 – Birgit Fischer, German kayaker; winner of eight Olympic gold medals
1963 – Paul O'Neill, American baseball player and sportscaster; five-time World Series champion
1965 – Carrot Top, American comedian
1966 – Téa Leoni, American actress
1967 – Ed Balls, British politician; Shadow Chancellor of the Exchequer
1968 – Oumou Sangaré, Grammy Award-winning Malian Wassoulou musician
1971 – Sean Astin, American actor, director and producer
1974 – Dominic Raab, British politician; First Secretary of State and Secretary of State for Foreign and Commonwealth Affairs
1975 – Chelsea Handler, American comedian, actress, author, and television host
1976 – Rashida Jones, American actress and writer
1981 – Park Ji-sung, South Korean footballer; the most successful Asian player with 19 career trophies
1982 – Maria Kanellis, American professional wrestler, actress, and model
  1982   – Flavia Pennetta, Italian tennis player; winner of the 2015 US Open
1986 – Jameela Jamil, English actress and presenter
1988 – Tom Marshall, English photo colouriser and artist
1989 – Kana Hanazawa, Japanese voice actress and singer
1992 – Jorge Soler, Cuban baseball player 
1994 – Fred VanVleet, American basketball player
1995 – Viktoriya Tomova, Bulgarian tennis player
1999 – Gianluigi Donnarumma, Italian international footballer; youngest goalkeeper to play for Italy
  1999   – Rocky, South Korean singer, dancer and songwriter

Deaths

Pre-1600
 806 – Tarasios, patriarch of Constantinople
 891 – Fujiwara no Mototsune, Japanese regent (b. 836)
1522 – William Lily, English scholar and educator (b. 1468)
1536 – Berchtold Haller, German-Swiss theologian and reformer (b. 1492)
1547 – Vittoria Colonna, marchioness of Pescara (b. 1490)

1601–1900
1601 – Robert Devereux, 2nd Earl of Essex, English general and politician, Lord Lieutenant of Ireland (b. 1566)
1634 – Albrecht von Wallenstein, Austrian general and politician (b. 1583)
1636 – Santorio Santorio, Italian biologist (b. 1561)
1655 – Daniël Heinsius, Flemish poet and scholar (b. 1580)
1682 – Alessandro Stradella, Italian composer (b. 1639)
1710 – Daniel Greysolon, Sieur du Lhut, French soldier and explorer (b. 1639)
1713 – Frederick I of Prussia (b. 1657)
1723 – Christopher Wren, English architect, designed St Paul's Cathedral (b. 1632)
1756 – Eliza Haywood, English actress and poet (b. 1693)
1796 – Samuel Seabury, American bishop (b. 1729)
1805 – Thomas Pownall, English politician, Governor of the Province of Massachusetts Bay (b. 1722)
1819 – Francisco Manoel de Nascimento, Portuguese-French poet and educator (b. 1734)
1822 – William Pinkney, American politician and diplomat, 7th United States Attorney General (b. 1764)
1841 – Philip P. Barbour, American lawyer, judge, and politician, 12th Speaker of the United States House of Representatives (b. 1783)
1850 – Daoguang Emperor of China (b. 1782)
1852 – Thomas Moore, Irish poet and lyricist (b. 1779)
1865 – Otto Ludwig, German author, playwright, and critic (b. 1813)
1870 – Henrik Hertz, Danish poet and playwright (b. 1797)
1877 – Jung Bahadur Rana, Nepalese ruler (b. 1816)
1878 – Townsend Harris, American merchant, politician, and diplomat, United States Ambassador to Japan (b. 1804)
1899 – Paul Reuter, German-English journalist and businessman, founded Reuters (b. 1816)

1901–present
1906 – Anton Arensky, Russian pianist and composer (b. 1861)
1910 – Worthington Whittredge, American painter and educator (b. 1820)
1911 – Friedrich Spielhagen, German author, theorist, and translator (b. 1829)
1912 – William IV, Grand Duke of Luxembourg (b. 1852)
1914 – John Tenniel, English illustrator (b. 1820)
1915 – Charles Edwin Bessey, American botanist, author, and academic (b. 1845)
1920 – Marcel-Auguste Dieulafoy, French archaeologist and engineer (b. 1844)
1928 – William O'Brien, Irish journalist and politician (b. 1852)
1934 – Elizabeth Gertrude Britton, American botanist and academic (b. 1857)
  1934   – John McGraw, American baseball player and manager (b. 1873)
1945 – Mário de Andrade, Brazilian author, poet, and photographer (b. 1893)
1950 – George Minot, American physician and academic, Nobel Prize laureate (b. 1885)
1953 – Sergei Winogradsky, Ukrainian-Russian microbiologist and ecologist (b. 1856)
1957 – Mark Aldanov, Russian author and critic (b. 1888)
  1957   – Bugs Moran, American mob boss (b. 1893)
1963 – Melville J. Herskovits, American anthropologist and academic (b. 1895)
1964 – Alexander Archipenko, Ukrainian sculptor and illustrator (b. 1887)
  1964   – Grace Metalious, American author (b. 1924)
1970 – Mark Rothko, Latvian-American painter and academic (b. 1903)
1971 – Theodor Svedberg, Swedish chemist and academic, Nobel Prize laureate (b. 1884)
1972 – Gottfried Fuchs, German-Canadian Olympic soccer player (b. 1889)
1975 – Elijah Muhammad, American religious leader (b. 1897)
1978 – Daniel James, Jr., American general and pilot (b. 1920)
1980 – Robert Hayden, American poet and academic (b. 1913)
1983 – Tennessee Williams, American playwright, and poet (b. 1911)
1996 – Haing S. Ngor, Cambodian-American physician and author (b. 1940)
1997 – Andrei Sinyavsky, Russian journalist and publisher (b. 1925)
1998 – W. O. Mitchell, Canadian author and playwright (b. 1914)
1999 – Glenn T. Seaborg, American chemist and academic, Nobel Prize laureate (b. 1912)
2001 – A. R. Ammons, American poet and critic (b. 1926)
  2001   – Don Bradman, Australian international cricketer; holder of world record batting average (b. 1908)
2005 – Peter Benenson, English lawyer, founded Amnesty International (b. 1921)
2008 – Hans Raj Khanna, Indian judge and advocate; upholder of civil liberties (b. 1912) 
2010 – Ihsan Dogramaci, Turkish pediatrician and academic (b. 1915)
2012 – Louisiana Red, American singer-songwriter and guitarist (b. 1932)
2015 – Harve Bennett, American screenwriter and producer (b. 1930)
  2015   – Eugenie Clark, American biologist and academic; noted ichthyologist (b. 1922)
2017 – Bill Paxton, American actor and filmmaker (b. 1955)
2020 – Dmitry Yazov, last Marshal of the Soviet Union (b. 1924)
2022 – Farrah Forke, American actress (b. 1968)
  2022   – Shirley Hughes, English author and illustrator (b. 1927)
2023 – Gordon Pinsent, Canadian actor, director and screenwriter (b. 1930)

Holidays and observances
Christian feast days:
Æthelberht of Kent
Blessed Ciriaco María Sancha y Hervás
Gerland of Agrigento
John Roberts, writer and missionary (Anglican Communion)
Hamburg Matthiae-mahl, feast of Hanseatic League cities on the mediaeval first day of spring
Blessed Maria Adeodata Pisani
Blessed Robert of Arbrissel, founder of Fontevraud Abbey
Saint Walpurga (she was canonised on 1 May c. 870 and Walpurgis Night is celebrated 30 April)
February 25 (Eastern Orthodox liturgics)
Kitano Baika-sai or "Plum Blossom Festival" (Kitano Tenman-gu Shrine, Kyoto, Japan)
Memorial Day for the Victims of the Communist Dictatorships (Hungary)
National Day (Kuwait)
People Power Day (Philippines)
Revolution Day in Suriname
Soviet Occupation Day (Georgia)

References

External links

 
 
 

Days of the year
February